Joh. Berenberg, Gossler & Co. KG, commonly known as Berenberg Bank and also branded as simply Berenberg, is a multinational full-service private bank and investment bank based in Hamburg, Germany.

It was founded by the Flemish Berenberg family in 1590 and is the world's oldest merchant bank. Its owners, the Berenberg/Gossler family, belonged to the ruling elite of Hanseatic merchants of the city-republic of Hamburg and several family members served in the city-state's government from 1735. Like many other merchant bankers, the Berenbergs were originally cloth merchants. The bank's name refers to Johann Berenberg, his son-in-law Johann Hinrich Gossler and the latter's son-in-law L.E. Seyler, and has remained unchanged since 1791. The bank has operated continuously since 1590 and is still part-owned by members of the Berenberg-Gossler family.

Berenberg Bank is active in investment banking, particularly pan-European equity research, brokerage and equity capital markets transactions, in addition to private banking for wealthy customers, asset management and corporate banking. Since the 2000s, the company has increasingly focused on investment banking. Berenberg Bank has around 1,600 employees; in addition to its headquarters in Hamburg, it has significant presences in London, Frankfurt and New York City, and 14 further offices in Europe and the Americas. After years of expanding its activities in London, which is now the second largest office with a staff of around 500 and seat of most of its investment banking activities, Berenberg Bank has recently focused on expanding in the United States and Asia. 

The bank is organized as a limited partnership with personally liable partners, and is noted for its conservative business strategy. Following the 2008 financial crisis, the bank has expanded rapidly. The former senior partner and head of the bank Hans-Walter Peters was also president of the Association of German Banks, having succeeded Deutsche Bank CEO Jürgen Fitschen in 2016 (until 2021). In 2018 Berenberg Bank, in line with its increasing focus on investment banking, sold its Swiss private banking subsidiary Berenberg Bank (Schweiz) AG to a group of investors, and the Swiss company will be known as Bergos.
Today the bank is run by three managing partners: Hendrik Riehmer, David Mortlock, Christian Kühn.

History 

The Berenberg Company was founded in Hamburg in 1590 by the brothers Hans (1561–1626) and Paul Berenberg (1566–1645). In 1585, the Protestant Berenbergs left Antwerp in the Duchy of Brabant (today's Belgium), at the time one of Europe's commercial centres, as Protestants in the southern Low Countries were given the choice either to convert to Catholicism or leave the country. The bank has been continuously owned by their descendants ever since.

The Berenbergs were originally cloth merchants and quickly extended their business to other commodities. Hans Berenberg's grandson Cornelius Berenberg (1634–1711) was the first to engage in merchant banking and developed the company into a very successful merchant house and merchant bank. He forged trade links with France, Spain, Portugal, Italy, Scandinavia and Russia. Family connections of the Berenbergs were instrumental to the development, especially in Livorno and Lisbon with their colonies of wealthy Dutch merchants. Members of the Berenberg family were also merchants in London from the 17th century.

Cornelius Berenberg's son, Rudolf Berenberg (1680–1746), was elected a Senator, that is, a member of the government of the city-state, in 1735. By the mid 18th century, investment banking and acceptance credits comprised a significant part of the firm's activities. Rudolf Berenberg was married to Anna Elisabeth Amsinck (1690–1748), a daughter of the Lisbon and Hamburg merchant Paul Amsinck (1649–1706) and a descendant of the Welser family. Their sons, Senator Paul Berenberg (1716–1768) and Johann Berenberg (1718–1772), became owners of the Berenberg company.

In 1768 Senator Paul Berenberg died childless, while his brother Johann Berenberg lost his only son in the same year. To ensure the continuation of the firm, Johann Berenberg took on his son-in-law Johann Hinrich Gossler (1738–90) as a new partner in 1769; he had married Berenberg's only daughter Elisabeth Berenberg (1749–1822) the previous year. The Gossler family is known since the 17th century, when Johann Hinrich Gossler's great-grandfather was a Hamburg burgher. Elisabeth Berenberg was the last member of the Hamburg Berenberg family, which became extinct in the male line upon her death in 1822. Johann Hinrich Gossler and Elisabeth Berenberg were the founders of the Berenberg-Gossler family, that rose to great prominence in Hamburg from the late 18th century. In the 19th-century city republic of Hamburg the (Berenberg-)Gossler family and the closely related Amsinck family were widely regarded as the city state's two most prominent families.

In 1788 Johann Hinrich Gossler took on a new partner, his son-in-law L.E. Seyler (1758–1836), who had married his eldest child Anna Henriette Gossler (1771–1836). From 1790, the company was led by L.E. Seyler, and his mother-in-law Elisabeth Berenberg was a partner in her own right from 1790 to 1800. L.E. Seyler, a son of the famous theatre director Abel Seyler, was one of Hamburg's foremost merchants in his lifetime, and served as President of the Commerz-Deputation and as a member of the city's government during the French rule of the city. To reflect Seyler joining the company, its name was changed to Joh. Berenberg, Gossler & Co. from 1 January 1791, and has remained unchanged since.

As head of the Berenberg company L.E. Seyler greatly increased the company's international trade, and was one of the first merchants and bankers from Germany who established trade relations with the newly independent United States and with East Asia. By 1800 the capital of the company has doubled since he became a partner. Seyler remained the company's senior partner for 46 years, and when he died in 1836 he had been with the company for 61 years. Seyler's seventeen years younger brother-in-law Johann Heinrich Gossler (1775–1842) joined the firm in 1798 and became a Hamburg senator in 1821; the two brothers-in-law jointly led the company for decades, with Seyler as the more experienced partner and Gossler gradually taking on more responsibilities as Seyler eventually retreated into semi-retirement.

During the Napoleonic Wars the company lost half its capital, but it emerged stronger than ever and quickly regained and surpassed its former size once the war ended.

Anna Henriette Gossler and L.E. Seyler's children were briefly co-owners of Berenberg Bank; they have many prominent descendants in Hamburg and Norway, e.g. in the family Paus. Berenberg Bank was also involved in financing Norway's leading industrial enterprise, Blaafarveværket, whose CEO and co-owner Benjamin Wegner was Anna Henriette Gossler and L.E. Seyler's son-in-law. Anna Henriette Gossler's younger brother Johann Heinrich Gossler (II)'s son Hermann Gossler (1802–1877) was a senator and First Mayor of Hamburg. The latter's younger brother Johann Heinrich Gossler (III) (1805–1879) became a partner in the bank and was the father of Baron Johann von Berenberg-Gossler (1839–1913), who also became a partner in the bank. In 1880 the Hamburg Senate granted the latter the name of Berenberg-Gossler, and in 1888, he was ennobled in the Kingdom of Prussia as von Berenberg-Gossler. In 1910 Johann von Berenberg-Gossler was given the title Baron. Baron Johann von Berenberg-Gossler was the father of John von Berenberg-Gossler (1866–1943), a Senator and German Ambassador in Rome.

In the 19th century, the bank financed the industrialisation process in Hamburg and transportation activities, and was strongly involved in the North American trade and its finance. The company was (together with the merchant house H.J. Merck & Co.) one of the main founders of Germany's largest shipping companies, the Hamburg America Line (HAPAG) in 1847 and Norddeutscher Lloyd in 1857. They were also one of the main founders of Vereinsbank Hamburg (now the HypoVereinsbank) (1857), the Ilseder Hütte ironworks (1858), and the Norddeutsche Versicherungs AG (1857). The houses of Berenberg-Gossler, H.J. Merck and Salomon Heine were also the main founders of the Norddeutsche Bank in 1856, the first joint-stock bank in northern Germany and one of the predecessors of Deutsche Bank. Furthermore, Berenberg Bank was among the founding shareholders of Bergens Privatbank (1855), the Hongkong and Shanghai Banking Corporation (1865), Den Danske Landmandsbank (1871) and Svenska Handelsbanken (1871). Berenberg Bank had a close cooperation with Barings Bank of London and was Baring's representative in Germany.

The Berenberg family and company had branches in Portugal, Italy and London from the 17th century. A branch of the Berenberg family also established the London firm Meyer & Berenberg in the 17th century and were among London's prominent West Indies merchants. In recent years Berenberg's London office in Threadneedle Street has grown rapidly to become Berenberg's second largest office, focusing on investment banking and private banking for the ultra wealthy.

Logo

The company's logo is a stylized version of the combined coat of arms of the Berenberg and Gossler families, featuring the Berenberg bear (adopted in the 16th century in Belgium) and the Gossler goose foot (adopted in 1773 by Johann Hinrich Gossler).

Business segments 

The bank is active in the following business segments:
Wealth Management (typically, the minimum deposit required to open or maintain an account is €1 million)
Investment banking
Asset management
Corporate banking

Branches 

Berenberg Bank has its head office in Hamburg and significant presences in London, Frankfurt and New York City, as well as offices in Düsseldorf, Munich, Münster, Stuttgart, Brussels, Geneva, Paris, Boston, San Francisco and Chicago. In Zurich, the previous subsidiary Berenberg Bank (Schweiz) AG, has established itself as an independent Swiss Private Bank, Bergos AG, in September 2018. In 2017 Berenberg Capital Markets rented the entire 53rd floor of 1251 Avenue of the Americas in Manhattan.

Philanthropy and donations 
The Berenberg Bank Stiftung is a philanthropic foundation founded in 1990 on the occasion of the 400th anniversary of the establishment of Berenberg Bank. The chairman of the board is Dr. Hans-Walter Peters. The foundation awards several prizes, including the Berenberg Culture Prize to younger artists and the Berenberg Scholarships to individual artists and groups. From 2009, the Universitäts-Gesellschaft Hamburg has awarded the Berenberg Prize for Scientific Language, that promotes German as a scientific language.

Berenberg Bank is the largest Hamburg donor to the CDU.

Ownership 

Berenberg Bank is currently run by three personally liable partners, Hendrik Riehmer, David Mortlock and Christian Kühn.

The ownership structure is as follows:

von Berenberg-Gossler family and relatives (including those not themselves descended from the Berenberg family) 30.88% 
PetRie Beteiligungsgesellschaft mbH (Hans-Walter Peters, Hendrik Riehmer) and Hans-Walter Peters 21.41% 
Hendrik Riehmer, David Mortlock, Christian Kühn and former personally liable partners 7.81% 
Christian Erbprinz zu Fürstenberg 14.25% 
Jan Philipp Reemtsma 14.25%
Compagnie du Bois Sauvage S.A. 11.40%

Partners
Berenberg family 

Non-family partners

See also 

Berenberg family
Gossler family
Seyler family

References

Literature 
Clarita Bernstorff, Hartwig Bernstorff, Emanuel Eckardt, Change is the only constant: Berenberg; a history of one of the world's oldest banks, Hanser Literaturverlage, 336 pages, 
Maria Möring, Joh. Berenberg, Gossler & Co. Hamburg, Hamburg, Wirtschaftsgeschichtliche Forschungsstelle, 1961
Joh. Berenberg, Gossler & Co.: Die Geschichte eines deutschen Privatbankhauses, Berenberg Bank, Hamburg 1990

External links 

 
  (Luxembourg)
Company history

 
Banks of Germany
Banks of Switzerland
Investment banks
Private banks
Multinational companies headquartered in Germany
Banks established in the 16th century
Organizations established in the 1590s
1590 establishments in the Holy Roman Empire
Berenberg-Gossler family
German brands